Park Arena Komaki is an arena in Komaki, Aichi, Japan.

Gallery

References

Basketball venues in Japan
Indoor arenas in Japan
Nagoya Diamond Dolphins
Sports venues in Aichi Prefecture
Sports venues completed in 2001
2001 establishments in Japan
Komaki